The 1978 Houston Cougars football team, also known as the Houston Cougars, Houston, or UH, represented the University of Houston in the 1978 NCAA Division I-A football season. The Cougars were led by 17th-year head coach Bill Yeoman and played their home games at the Astrodome in Houston, Texas. The team competed as members of the Southwest Conference, winning the conference with a 7–1 conference record. This was Houston's first outright conference title and second overall, in only their third year in the league. They were invited to the 1979 Cotton Bowl Classic, played on New Year's Day, where they were defeated by Notre Dame. Houston was ranked 10th in the final AP Poll of the season and 11th in the Coaches' Poll.

Schedule

References

Houston
Houston Cougars football seasons
Southwest Conference football champion seasons
Houston Cougars football